Scythe is a free software physics modeling program. It allows the merging of physics and graphics content in one package. It provides native support for modeling the rigid body physics for the Newton Game Dynamics, the Open Dynamics Engine and PhysX engine. The Physics Abstraction Layer also provides support for the Scythe format.

History
The Scythe Physics Editor was first developed as closed source software in 2006. It was released as open source software with a GNU General Public License in September 2007, after the developers decided to focus activities on a new game.

Features
 Allows artists to control the physics environment
 Character and ragdoll editor
 Supports multiple physics engines
 Can create concave hulls for objects

See also
 COLLADA, a COLLAborative Design Activity for establishing an interchange file format for interactive 3D applications, also features physics supports.
 Physics Abstraction Layer, a physics engine abstraction system to provide a uniform programming interface to multiple physics engines.

External links
 Sourceforge page

2007 software
3D graphics software